Maksim Rimovich Turishchev (born 5 March 2002) is a Russian football player. He plays as a striker for FC Torpedo Moscow on loan from FC Rostov.

Club career
After spending his junior career with FC Lokomotiv Moscow, on 3 February 2021 he signed a 4.5-year contract with FC Rostov.

He made his debut in the Russian Premier League for Rostov on 17 March 2021 in a game against FC Rotor Volgograd.

On 16 July 2022, Turishchev joined FC Torpedo Moscow on loan.

Career statistics

References

External links
 
 

2002 births
Footballers from Moscow
Living people
Russian footballers
Russia youth international footballers
Association football forwards
FC Rostov players
FC Torpedo Moscow players
Russian Premier League players